The tenth season of La Voz premiered on June 1, 2021 on Azteca Uno. María José is the only coach returning from the previous season. Miguel Bosé, Edith Márquez and Jesús Navarro joined the panel replacing Ricardo Montaner, Belinda and Christian Nodal. Eddy Vilard and Sofía Aragón both returned for their second season as hosts.

On Wednesday, August 11, 2021, Sherlyn Sánchez was announced the winner and crowned La Voz México 2021, alongside her coach Edith Márquez. This made her the youngest contestant to win the show, beating previous season winner, Fernando Sujo.

Coaches 

Filming of the season started in February 2021, revealing María José as the only coach returning from the previous season, since the other three coaches had personal projects; Ricardo Montaner filming La Voz Argentina, Belinda filming a Netflix series and Christian Nodal deciding to focus on his musical career. Their replacements were season two coach Miguel Bosé, and first-time coaches Edith Márquez, and Jesús Navarro.

Teams 
Color key

 Winner
 Runner-up
 Third place
 Fourth place
 Eliminated in the Final Phase
 Eliminated in the Top 3
 Stolen in the Battles
 Eliminated in the Battles
 Stolen in the Knockouts
 Eliminated in the Knockouts
 Withdrew

Blind auditions 
In the Blind auditions, each coach had to complete their teams with 39 contestants. Each coach had two Blocks to prevent one of the other coaches from getting a contestant.

Episode 1 (June 1) 
At the beginning of the episode, María José performed "Lo que tenías conmigo", Miguel Bosé performed "Morena mía", Edith Márquez performed "Mi error, mi fantasia" and Jesús Navarro performed "Me niego".

Episode 2 (June 7) 
During the episode, Miguel Bosé performed "Nada Particular" and Reik performed "Creo en Ti".

Episode 3 (June 8) 
During the episode, María José performed "Sólo el Amor Lastima Así" and Jesús Navarro performed "No Desaparecerá".

Episode 4 (June 14) 
During the episode, Edith Márquez performed "En Una De Esas" and Jesús Navarro performed "Fui".

Episode 5 (June 15) 
During the episode, María José performed "Lo Que Te Mereces" and Edith Márquez performed "Entiende Que Ya".

Episode 6 (June 21) 
During the episode, María José performed "Me Equivoqué".

Episode 7 (June 22) 
During the episode, María José performed "La Ocasión Para Amarnos" and Reik performed "Ya me enteré".

Episode 8 (June 28) 
During the episode, Miguel Bosé performed "Te Amaré" and Jesús Navarro performed "Con Los Años Que Me Quedan".

Episode 9 (June 29) 
During the episode, María José performed "Tú Ya Sabes a Mí" and Edith Márquez performed "Aunque Sea En Otra Vida".

Episode 10 (July 5) 
During the episode, Jesús Navarro performed "Contigo en la Distancia".

Episode 11 (July 6) 
During the episode, María José performed "Las Que Se Ponen Bien La Falda" and Edith Márquez performed "¿Quieres ser mi Amante?".

Knockouts 
The knockouts round started July 12. In this round, coaches can steal three losing artists from other coaches. Contestants who win their knockout or are stolen by another coach advance to the Battles.

Battles 
The battles round started July 27. In this round, coaches can steal two losing artists from other coaches. Contestants who win their battle or are stolen by another coach advance to the Top 3 round.

Top 3 
The Top 3 round started on August 3. After every performance, the artist's coach decides if the artist deserves a spot in the team's Top 3. If yes, the artist is given a chair by their coach. When all chairs are occupied the coach chooses an artist to seize his/her spot to the new artist and gets eliminated. Artists who are denied a chair by the coach are automatically eliminated. The Top 3 from each team advanced to the Semifinal.

Final phase

Day 1: Semifinal (August 10) 

In the Semifinal, the twelve remaining participants performed in order to become one of their coach's choice to advance into the Finale. Each coach advanced with two artists, with the third member being eliminated.

Day 2: Finale (August 11) 
The Finale was prerecorded, due to the ongoing COVID-19 pandemic. In the first round, the participants sang a solo song. Following those performances, each coach had to choose one artist to advance to the second round. In the second round, the four finalists performed their song from the Blind auditions. The show's production shot four different winning results (one per finalist), but only the chosen winner by the public at home one was shown on TV.

First round

Second round

Elimination chart

Color key 
Artist's info

Result details

Ratings

Artists who appeared on other shows or in previous seasons 

 Deyra Barrera participanted in the eight season of La Academia, where she was 14th place.
 Dugali participated in the first season, where they was part of Team Alejandro Sanz.
 Aby Espinosa participated in season three, where she was a semi-finalist of Team Wisin & Yandel.
 Francisco Treviño participated in season seven, where he was a semi-finalist of Team Maluma.
 Irenka Moro participated in the first season of La Voz Kids, where she was part of Team Maluma.
 Ari Benedik & Tony Rosher, each participanted separately in season nine. They became a duo for this season's participation.
 Enero del Moral participated in season seven, where he did not turn any chair.
 Amadeus Tijerina and Annika Oviedo participated in the first season of La Voz Kids, both of them part of Team Rosario Flores.
 Emilio Aceves participated in season four, where he was part of Team Laura Pausini.

References 

Mexico
2021 Mexican television seasons